Boran Kuzum (born 1 October 1992) is a Turkish actor. He graduated from the Theater Department of Istanbul University State Conservatory in 2015. Kuzum had studied economy at Ankara Gazi University for a year, but gave it up to study. His father, Bora Kuzum was the deputy manager of Ankara State Theatre. His mother, Fatma Zehra, is a graduate of Fine Arts.

Biography
In the same year, he played a protester named Pharmacist Suat in 6 episodes of the period drama Analar ve Anneler alongside Okan Yalabık and the Mad Sultan Mustafa I, in 10 episodes of the period drama Muhteşem Yüzyıl: Kösem. With Miray Daner, he played a Greek lieutenant named Leon in the period drama Vatanım Sensin, which won a Golden Butterfly Award for Best Series, spinn off crime series "Saygı", fantasy series Hakan: Muhafız and music video "Son Mektup". With Pınar Deniz, he played in film "Aşkın Kıyameti" for twice times.

He played "Konstantin Gavrilovich Treplev" in the play The Seagull by Anton Chekhov at the Istanbul Theater Festival's opening. The play won the Üstün Akmen Theatre Award for Best Play and was nominated for the Afife Jale Award.

Theatre

Filmography

Film

TV series

Short movie

Music Videos
Bergüzar Korel - "Son Mektup"

Commercial	 

Coca Cola
Eti Gong
Ford Puma
Levi’s® 501®

Awards

References

External links 
 

 

1992 births
Living people
21st-century Turkish male actors
Turkish male television actors
Turkish male film actors
Male actors from Ankara